The Harwich Formation is a geological formation found in the London Basin of southeastern  England. It is Ypresian (early Eocene) in age. It lies unconformably on the Lambeth Group over most of its extent, but may overlie either the Thanet Formation or the Chalk Group to the south. It is overlain by the London Clay Formation.

References

Geology of London
Paleogene England
Geologic formations of England